Michael Joseph Frendo (born 1960) is a Canadian engineer and investor. He is the former Executive Vice President of Polycom. Frendo has recently become the Chief Technology Officer (CTO) of the internet security company, Journey.ai.

Career

Infinera
In 2010, Frendo joined the optical transmission equipment manufacturer Infinera as Vice President of Architecture. Working for Infinera, he headed the team responsible for developing systems and optical architecture, as well as their implementation over the long-term.

Polycom
In May 2014, Frendo assumed the position of executive vice president of worldwide engineering at Polycom, a multinational voice and video communication technology company. In this position, he leads Polycom engineers around the world in creating visual collaboration products to be used anywhere.

Journey.ai
After leaving Polycom, Frendo was appointed as the CTO of the new technology company Journey.ai. Journey.ai Identifies Platforms, solves for security, privacy, and customer experience.

Investments
Michael Frendo has been known to invest in internet startups, financial businesses and restaurants. He has recently been part of the opening of an upscale sports bar in Niagara-on-the-Lake called Bricks and Barley's, along with a lot of properties across the Niagara Region.

References

External links
 Journey.ai

1960 births
Living people
20th-century Canadian businesspeople
21st-century Canadian businesspeople
Businesspeople from St. Catharines
Canadian business executives
University of Western Ontario alumni
McMaster University alumni